Vystavkovyi Tsentr (literally Exhibition Center) is a station on the Kyiv Metro's Obolonsko–Teremkivska Line, named after the exposition center that is located in the vicinity.

Active construction began on this project in 2010 after the opening of the three new stations on the Obolonsko–Teremkivska Line from the former Lybidska terminus.

The station is designed as shallow and has one underground vault, similarly to adjacent "Vasylkivska". The southwestern platform end is linked by a four-stripe escalator to the underground entrance hall, ending into an underpass under Vasylkivska street. Further plans exist to connect it with another one under Holosiivskyi avenue, so as to make one of the exits right beside the exhibition center.

The opening was initially scheduled for 31 December 2011, as re-planned the station was opened on 27 December 2011.

The official opening ceremony took place at 11:00 in the morning, the first train with passengers left for the new station at 13:10.

References

External links 
  - Vystavkovyi Tsentr Kyiv Metro Station video

Kyiv Metro stations
Railway stations opened in 2011
2011 establishments in Ukraine